Jesper Tørring (born 27 September 1947 in Randers) is a Danish former athlete who competed in 110 metres hurdles and long jump at the 1972 Summer Olympics and in high jump at the 1976 Summer Olympics.

References

1947 births
Living people
Danish male long jumpers
Danish male hurdlers
Danish male high jumpers
Olympic athletes of Denmark
Athletes (track and field) at the 1972 Summer Olympics
Athletes (track and field) at the 1976 Summer Olympics
European Athletics Championships medalists
People from Randers
Sportspeople from the Central Denmark Region
20th-century Danish people